West Piney Creek also known as the Little Piney River is a stream in Texas County in the Ozarks of south central Missouri. It is a tributary to the Big Piney River.

The confluence is within the Piney River Narrows State Natural Area.

The stream was named "West Piney" due to the fact that it enters the west side of the Big Piney.

References

Rivers of Texas County, Missouri
Rivers of Missouri